A thumbprint is a form of fingerprint.

Thumbprint may also refer to:

 Carbon thumbprint, the carbon dioxide equivalent impact of an individual product or service
 Thumbprint sign, a term in radiology
 Thumbprint, a term for public key fingerprint used in Microsoft software
 Thumbprint, a 2004 novel by Friedrich Glauser
 "Thumbprint", a 2007 short story and 2013 comic by Joe Hill
 Thumbprint cookie, in which a well is made with the thumb and filled with jam or filling
 Regmaglypt, the characteristic thumbprint-shaped  depressions on a meteorite caused by ablation